The small-eared dormouse (Graphiurus microtis) is a species of rodent in the family Gliridae. It is found in Angola, Botswana, Eritrea, Ethiopia, Kenya, Lesotho, Malawi, Mozambique, Namibia, South Africa, Sudan, Eswatini, Tanzania, Zambia, and Zimbabwe.

References

Holden, M. E.. 2005. Family Gliridae. pp. 819–841 in Mammal Species of the World a Taxonomic and Geographic Reference. D. E. Wilson and D. M. Reeder eds. Johns Hopkins University Press, Baltimore.

Graphiurus
Mammals described in 1887
Taxonomy articles created by Polbot